A. Venkatesh is an Indian film director and actor working in Tamil cinema. Beginning his career as an assistant, he directed his first film, Mahaprabhu, in 1996.

Career

Initially, he worked as an assistant to director K. Rajeshwar on Nyaya Tharasu (1989) and Idhaya Thamarai (1990). He assisted Pavithran on Vasanthakala Paravai (1991) and Suriyan (1992), then he was an associate director to director Shankar on Gentleman (1993) and Kadhalan (1994). During the shooting of the film Kadhalan, producer G. K. Reddy approached him to direct a film. In 1996, he made his directional debut through Mahaprabhu starring R. Sarathkumar, Sukanya and Vineetha. He has directed Vijay's movies including action film Selva (1996) and romance film Nilaave Vaa (1998). In 1999, he directed a drama film Pooparika Varugirom starring Sivaji Ganesan, Vikram Krishna and Malavika.

Following the death of director Thirupathisamy in 2001, Venkatesh was briefly announced as the new director of the film Velan featuring Vijay and Priyanka Chopra, but the project was later shelved.

He started directing action movies with Prashanth's Chocolate (2001), Vijay's Bhagavathi (2002), and Silambarasan's Dum (2003) and Kuthu (2004). These were followed by Sarathkumar's Aai (2004), Chanakya (2005) and Arjun's Vathiyar (2006).

During 2008, Venkatesh worked simultaneously on six productions, which were at different stages of completion. The Arjun-starrer Durai (2008) and Arun Vijay's Malai Malai (2009) were released first, while Sundar C's Vaadaa (2010) and Bharath's Killadi (2015) had delayed releases. Two further films, Prashanth's Petrol and Sarathkumar's Imaya Malai, were subsequently shelved mid-production.

He has also acted in various Tamil movies, notably Angadi Theru (2010). Venkatesh returned after a two-and-a-half year break with Nethra (2019). The filmmaker says the delay is because he had to fulfil commitments as an actor before he could get back to direction. The film is a psycho-thriller based on a true event which he was witness to at an airport in Canada.

Filmography

As director

As actor

 Vasanthakala Paravai (1991)
 Suriyan (1992) - Telegram Office clerk
 Kadhalan(1994) - Cameo appearance ("Kadhalikum Pennin" song)
 Nilaave Vaa (1998) - Christian who prays at Hindu temple
 Angaadi Theru (2010) - Karungali
 Sattapadi Kutram (2011) - Ekambaram
 Mahaan Kanakku (2011)
 Paagan (2012)
 Azhagan Azhagi (2013) - Rathinavel
 Naan Rajavaga Pogiren (2013) - Isakkimuthu Annachi
 Summa Nachunu Irukku (2013)
 Goli Soda (2014)
 Touring Talkies (2015)
 Rombha Nallavan Da Nee (2015)
 Iravum Pagalum Varum (2015)
 Pallikoodam Pogamale (2015)
 Sivappu (2015)
 Pagiri (2016)
 Aandavan Kattalai (2016)
 Thodari (2016)
 Nisabdham (2017)
 Kadugu (2017)
 Onaaigal Jakkiradhai (2018)
Torchlight (2018)
Thodraa (2018)
Nethra (2019)
Asuran (2019)
Nungambakkam (2020)
 Alti (2020)
Oh My Dog (2022)
Laththi (2022)

Web series

References

Tamil film directors
Living people
Film directors from Tamil Nadu
Male actors in Tamil cinema
20th-century Indian film directors
21st-century Indian film directors
1967 births